Kan shir Kesh Olya castle is a historical castle located in Bijar County in Kurdistan Province, The longevity of this fortress dates back to the 1st millennium BC.

References 

Castles in Iran